Shehr-e-Malal is a 2020 Pakistani family drama television series, premiered on Express Entertainment on 13 February 2020. Produced by Zeeshan Khan under TNI Productions, it stars Maria Wasti, Shahood Alvi, Hajra Yamin and Ali Abbas in lead roles. This serial was shot approximately in 2018 but release was delayed and later telecasted after two years.

Plot 

Tabinda (Maria Wasti) and Umer Hasan (Shahood Alvi) once were in a relationship are now heading their own families. As a result of misunderstandings, they broke off and part ways in the past. Tabinda married a rich business man and is now taking care of her husband's business as he’s disabled, whereas Umer married the daughter of a business tycoon. The story takes a new turn when both meet after several years. Tabinda goes to Umer’s house and asked for his daughter Rameen (Hajra Yamin)'s proposal for  Shazir (Ali Abbas). Shazir is Tabinda's step-son and both Shazir & Rameen are in love with each other. Umer eventually denied the proposal. Broken heart Rameen tries to attempt suicide. Tabinda spread the suicidal act of Rameen to defame Umer which got attention of media. Umer helpless before Rameen, begs Tabinda to accept his daughter. This time, Tabinda agrees for the proposal and plans to take revenge from Umer’s daughter. Tabinda created misunderstandings between Shazir and Rameen after marriage, but eventually she created problem for herself that result in her own family's loss.

Cast 
 Maria Wasti as Tabinda
 Hajra Yamin as Rameen
 Ali Abbas as Shazir
 Shahood Alvi as Umer; Rameen's father
 Rabya Kulsoom as Maria; Rameen's sister
 Zainab Qayyum as Rameen's mother
 Humaira Zaheer as Minal's aunt
 Afshan Qureshi as Tabinda's mother
 Raeed Muhammad Alam as Kamran
 Ayub Khoso
 Srha Asghar as Minal
 Fauzia Mushtaq
 Imran Raza

References

External links 
Official website

2020 Pakistani television series debuts
Pakistani drama television series
Urdu-language television shows
Pakistani television series